is a trans-Neptunian object (TNO) of the "cold" cubewano class orbiting the Sun in the Kuiper belt of the outer Solar System. It was discovered on November 8, 1994, by Alan Fitzsimmons, Donal O'Ceallaigh, and Iwan P. Williams at Roque de los Muchachos Observatory on the island of La Palma, Spain.

 is the fourth cubewano to be given an official Minor Planet Center catalog number.

References

External links 
 

Cold classical Kuiper belt objects
1994 VK8
1994 VK8
1994 VK8
19941108